Abdul Zahir (3 May 1910 – 21 October 1982) was Prime Minister of Afghanistan in the early 1970s, during the reign of King Zahir Shah. An ethnic Pashtun, he attended secondary school in Kabul and university in the United States, earning an MD from Columbia University and a Master's degree in public health from Johns Hopkins University. Zahir became a medical doctor and returned to Afghanistan to practice medicine, but eventually entered politics. His political positions included terms as Minister of Health, Speaker of House of the People from 1961 to 1968, and Ambassador to Italy and Pakistan. Most prominently, he served as Prime Minister of Afghanistan from June 1971 to December 1972. A few months after resigning, King Zahir Shah was overthrown and Abdul Zahir retired from politics.

Zahir was married to Quraisha and had four children. His son Ahmad Zahir was a popular musician who died in a car accident in 1979. His daughter Zahira Zahir is a hairdresser in Washington, D.C. His eldest son, Asif Zahir (1932—2000) was also politically active during his lifetime as Minister of Rural Rehabilitation and Development in 1980s and he remained ambassador in Kuwait (1989—1992) and Italy (1992—1993). He resigned from his post and lived in Peshawar, Pakistan, where he started a campaign for peace in Afghanistan by setting up a political group called the Afghan National Movement (ANM). His youngest daughter, Belqiss Zahir is currently living in Germany and runs a beauty salon.

References

External links 
Zahira's School – My Story

Ambassadors of Afghanistan to India
1910 births
1983 deaths
Pashtun people
People from Laghman Province
Johns Hopkins University alumni
Columbia University Vagelos College of Physicians and Surgeons alumni
Prime Ministers of Afghanistan
Afghan diplomats
Afghan expatriates in Pakistan
Government ministers of Afghanistan
Health ministers of Afghanistan
Ambassadors of Afghanistan to Pakistan
Ambassadors of Afghanistan to Kuwait
Ambassadors of Afghanistan to Italy
Speakers of the House of the People (Afghanistan)